Patrick Oketch is a Kenyan actor known for playing Charlie in the Citizen TV drama series Mother-in-Law.  He also portrayed Field Ruwe in the 2015 short film Intellectual Scum. Born in 1981 in the Mathare Slums, Patrick is a trained teacher currently pursuing a degree in Theatre Studies and Film Technology at Kenyatta University. He is also a prolific scriptwriter and  the script editor for the star-studded show MaEmpress on Maisha Magic.

Select filmography
The Captain of Nakara (2012)
Sticking Ribbons (2013) https://www.imdb.com/title/tt3233910/
Intellectual Scum (2015)
Kaze ni Tatsu Lion (2015)

References

External links
 

Living people
Kenyan male film actors
Kenyan male television actors
21st-century Kenyan male actors
1981 births